George W. Parsons (1845–1931) was a photographer in Pawhuska, Oklahoma, who photographed the Osage. The Newberry Library in Chicago has a collection of his photographs. The National Museum of American History has a collection of his photographs. His work is also in the Gilcrease Museum. The Wisconsin Historical Society also has his photographs in its collection.

He was born in Arkansas.

He photographed a view of Pawhuska before Oklahoma statehood (Oklahoma Territory) in 1887.

He was involved in a land dispute with a tenant. His businesses with his wife included a millinery, dressmaking store, and his photographic studio.

References

External links
G.W. Parsons photographs of Osage Indians collection at the Newberry Library
Findagrave entry

1845 births
1931 deaths
American photographers